Randy Adrian Vock (born 1 March 1994) is a Swiss freestyle wrestler. He won one of the bronze medals in the 61 kg event at the 2019 European Wrestling Championships held in Bucharest, Romania.

In 2017, he competed at the 2017 European U23 Wrestling Championship where he lost his bronze medal match against Ali Rahimzade of Azerbaijan.

Major results

References

External links 
 

Living people
1994 births
Place of birth missing (living people)
Swiss male sport wrestlers
European Wrestling Championships medalists